Holzheim am Forst is a municipality in the district of Regensburg in Bavaria in Germany. The municipality belongs together with the community Duggendorf and the market town Kallmünz to the administrative community Kallmünz.

References

Regensburg (district)